Akram al-Ajouri is a leader of Islamic Jihad Movement in Palestine (PIJ) . Al-Ajouri is based in Damascus and was unsuccessfully targeted in an Israeli Defence Forces (IDF) airstrike on November 12, 2019, on the same day the IDF killed Baha Abu al-Ata. The IDF described al-Ajouri as a member of the PIJ's political bureau in Syria. However, the airstrike on a building in Mezzeh area killed his son and daughter, and six were injured. Clashes began between Gaza and Israel following his attempted killing and the killing of al-Ata.

On 24 February 2020 it was reported that he was targeted by an Israeli strike in Damascus, Syria.

References

Islamic Jihad Movement in Palestine members
Living people
Year of birth missing (living people)